Donna Leon is the author of the Commissario Guido Brunetti crime novels series that was adapted as the German television series Commissario Brunetti.  The television program, which features music by André Rieu and has been produced 2000–2019 by the ARD in Germany, is also shown in Spain and in Finland by Yle.

Actors 
 Commissario Guido Brunetti: Joachim Król (episode 1–4), Uwe Kockisch (since episode 5)
 Paola Brunetti (Brunetti's wife): Barbara Auer (episode 1–4), Julia Jäger (since episode 5)
 Vice-Questore Patta: Michael Degen
 Sergente Lorenzo Vianello: Karl Fischer
 Signorina Elettra Zorzi: Annett Renneberg
 Raffaele ("Raffi") Brunetti: Patrick Diemling
 Chiara Brunetti: Laura-Charlotte Syniawa
 Sergente Alvise: Dietmar Mössmer
 Dottore Aurino: Ueli Jäggi

Episodes 
No.	Title	First broadcast	Novel
 1. "Vendetta"	(12 October 2000)	 #4 Case · 1995
 2. "The Anonymous Venetian"	(16 October 2000)	 #3 Case · 1994
 3. "Fatal Remedies"	(10 October 2002)	 #8 Case 1999
 4. "A Noble Radiance"	(17 October 2002)	 #7 Case · 1998
 5. "Death at La Fenice"	(23 October 2003	) #1 Case · 1992
 6. "Friends in High Places"	(31 October 2003)	 #9 Case · 2000
 7. "The Death of Faith" – aka "Quietly in Their Sleep"	(28 October 2004)	 #6 Case · 1997
 8. "Acqua Alta" – aka "Death in High Water"	(11 Nov. 2004)	 #5 Case · 1996
 9. "Doctored Evidence"	(13 October 2005)	#13 Case · 2004
 10. "Uniform Justice"	(10 Nov. 2005)	#12 Case · 2003
 11. "Death in a Strange Country"	(19 October 2006)	 #2 Case · 1993
 12. "A Sea of Troubles"	 (2 Nov. 2006)	#10 Case · 2001
 13. "Wilful Behaviour"	(15 May 2008)	#11 Case · 2002
 14. "Blood from a Stone"	(22 May 2008)	#14 Case · 2005
 15. "Through a Glass, Darkly"	(22 October 2009)	#15 Case · 2006
 16. "Suffer the Little Children"	 (7 October 2010)	#16 Case · 2007
 17. "The Girl of His Dreams"	(28 Apr. 2011)	#17 Case · 2008
 18. "About Face"	(14 Apr. 2012)	#18 Case · 2009
 19. "A Question of Belief"	(11 May 2013)	#19 Case · 2010
 20. "Rich Inheritance"
 21.
 22.
 23.
 24.
 25.
 26. "Earthly Remains" (25 December 2019)	#26 Case · 2017

See also
List of German television series
Available online by subscription on MHz Choice: "Donna Leon" series—first18 broadcast,2 interviews; Donna Leon, Uwe Kockisch.  Accessed 16 March 2018.  German with English subtitles, and the occasional common Italian expression in Italian. Average 1.55 run time.

References

External links
 Donna Leon series page at Das Erste (ARD) website (German)
 
 Donna Leon discusses German TV series (3.54–5.03) Appel Salon interview 15 April 2011 at YouTube

German crime television series
2000s German police procedural television series
2010s German police procedural television series
2000 German television series debuts
2019 German television series endings
2010s German television series
Television shows set in Venice
Television shows based on American novels
German-language television shows
Das Erste original programming